Mill Creek is a river located in Cayuga County, New York. It flows into Owasco Inlet by Moravia, New York.

References

Rivers of Cayuga County, New York
Rivers of New York (state)